Ulica Sezamkowa is the Polish co-production of the children's television series Sesame Street. It first aired in late 1996.

Production 
Sesame Street had previously been aired in Poland, with a Polish voiceover. 

The Muppets seen in the series were designed in the United States by Jim Henson Productions, using Polish children's sketches as references.

Characters
Characters exclusive to Ulica Sezamkowa include:
Smok Bazyli (Bazyli the Dragon), a jovial, furry dragon.
Owieczka Beata (Beata the Lamb), a lamb who thinks she knows everything.
Pędzipotwór (Speedmonster), a turquoise monster who is similar to Cookie Monster.

Sezamkowy Zakątek
Beginning in 2006, the Polish kids' channel MiniMini began airing a one-hour Sesame programming block, Sezamkowy Zakątek. The original Polish co-production of Sesame Street, Ulica Sezamkowa, is no longer in production.

Other languages (Sezamkowy Zakątek)
 Croatian: Ulica Sezam
 Czech: Sezamová Ulice
 Hungarian: Szezám Utca
 Italian: Gioca con Sesamo
 Romanian: Stradă Sesame
 Slovenian: Ulica Sesame
 Ukrainian: Вулиця Сезам‎
 Uzbek: Sezam Ko'Chasi

References

External links
  on Muppet Wiki

1996 television series debuts
2001 television series endings
Polish children's television series
Polish television series based on American television series
Polish television shows featuring puppetry
Sesame Street international co-productions